Anystream is an Internet software company that specializes in streaming media encoding technology.

The company designs scalable software that automates the laborious process of encoding and transcoding media for demanding broadcast and production environments. Anystream's Agility software has become a standard for streaming media encoding and broadcast transcoding for such media companies as BBC, Red Bee Media, BskyB, CNet, CNN, AOL, ESPN, Fox News, Foxsports.com, NFL Films, weather.com and others. 

In its Apreso product line, Anystream enables educators and trainers to create rich media content for the Web. Higher Education Institutions use Apreso Classroom to automatically capture and synchronize the classroom experience – the professor's voice and projected visuals and post an interactive, indexed Web-based version of the lecture to university websites or course management systems. This software is in use by several universities, including Temple University, Medical College of Georgia, University of Illinois at Urbana–Champaign and MIT.

Anystream was acquired by Telestream in 2010.

References

External links 
 Anystream corporate site

Software companies based in Virginia
Technology companies established in 2000
Film and video technology
Defunct software companies of the United States